Michaëlla Krajicek was the defending champion, but chose not to participate.

Grace Min won the title, defeating Sofia Kenin in the final, 6–4, 6–1.

Seeds

Draw

Finals

Top half

Bottom half

References
Main Draw

Kentucky Bank Tennis Championships - Singles
Lexington Challenger